Goalpara district is an administrative district of the Indian state of Assam.

History
It was a princely state ruled by the Koch kings and the then ruler of the undivided kingdom. Today the erstwhile Goalpara district is divided into Kokrajhar, Bongaigaon, Dhubri, and Goalpara district.

The name of the district Goalpara is said to have originally derived from 'Gwaltippika' meaning 'Guwali village' or the village of the milk men means (Yadav). The history of Goalpara goes back to several centuries. The district came under British rule in 1765. Before this, the area was under the control of the Koch dynasty. In 1826 the British accessed Assam and Goalpara was annexed to the North-East Frontier in 1874, along with the creation of district headquarters at Dhubri.

On 1 July 1983 two districts were split from Goalpara: Dhubri and Kokrajhar. On 29 September 1989 Bongaigaon district was created from parts of Goalpara and Kokrajhar.

Geography
The district headquarters are located at Goalpara.

Economy
In 2006 the Indian government named Goalpara one of the country's 250 most backward districts (out of a total of 640). It is one of the eleven districts in Assam currently receiving funds from the Backward Regions Grant Fund Programme (BRGF).

Political divisions
There are four Assam Legislative Assembly constituencies in this district: Dudhnoi, Goalpara East, Goalpara West, and Jaleswar. Dudhnoi is designated for scheduled tribes. Dudhnoi is in the Gauhati Lok Sabha constituency, whilst the other three are in the Dhubri Lok Sabha constituency.

Following are the present MLA's of Goalpara-
Goalpara East: AK Rasheed Alam (INC)
Goalpara West: Abdur Rashid Mondal (INC)
Jaleswar     : Aftabuddin (INC)
Dudhnoi      : Jadav Swargiary (INC)(ST)

Demographics
According to the 2011 census Goalpara district has a population of 1,008,183, roughly equal to the nation of Cyprus or the US state of Montana. of which 171,657 are children between 0–6 years of age. Goalpara has a sex ratio of 964 females for every 1000 males. The crude literacy rate of the district is 55.91%, while the effective literacy rate of 7+ population is 67.4%. Scheduled Castes and Scheduled Tribes make up 4.47% and 22.97% of the population respectively.

Religions

Muslim population in Goalpara district is 57.52%, while Hindu population is 34.51% and Christian Population stands at 7.72% and others include 0.25% respectively as per as census 2011 report. All the Garos are Christian. Way back in 1971, Hindus were slight majority in Goalpara district with forming 50.1% of the population, while Muslims were 41.5% at that time.

Languages

Assamese is the official language of the district and is spoken by 51.80% of the population, while Bengali is spoken by 28.83% as per 2011 census. These are followed by Garo, Rabha, Bodo, Hindi and Nepali speakers in descending order. Bengali speakers are 29.7% as per as 2011 census language census report, but Goalpara district is home to a large Muslim population of Bengali origin, most of whom now identify as Assamese speakers in the census.

Tourism

Tourist spots in the district include:
Sri Surya Pahar, a significant but relatively unknown archaeological site in Assam, a hill which showcases the remains of cultural heritage of three important religions of India, Buddhism, Jainism and Hinduism.
Dadan Hill has a Shiva Temple on its top. The temple was established by a general of the army of King Bana of Sonitpur named Dadan. 
Pir Majhar is situated in Goalpara town, a tomb of a saint named Hazarat Sayed Abul Kasem Kharasani. He is a saint who was respected by Hindus and Muslims alike.
Pir Majhar is situated in Katarihara, Golapara, a tomb of a Muslim saint named Al Bakdadi.
Hulukanda hill is located at the center of Goalpara.
Sri Tukreswari hill
Paglartek Baba at Barbhita
Urpod beel of Agia
Dhamar Risen beel of Lakhipur, Goalpara are some other attractions of the district.
Hulukanda Hill, near Bramhaputra river in the town used to be the center of salt trading during British rule. Daniel Raush used to stay there.

References

External links

 Official web site of Goalpara district

 
Districts of Assam
1876 establishments in India
Minority Concentrated Districts in India